Bernard Challen Webber (May 9, 1928 – January 24, 2009) was a United States Coast Guardsman. He was a petty officer assigned to Coast Guard Station Chatham, Massachusetts, where one of his duties was that of coxswain of Coast Guard Motor Lifeboat CG 36500. Webber and his crew of three rescued the crew of the stricken T2 tanker , which had broken in half during a storm on February 18, 1952 off Cape Cod. Webber maneuvered the 36-foot lifeboat under Pendletons stern as the tanker's crew, trapped in the stern section, abandoned the wreck of their ship on a Jacob's ladder into the Coast Guard motor lifeboat.

Career
Webber and his crew of three – Engineman Third Class Andrew Fitzgerald, Seaman Richard Livesey, and Seaman Ervin Maske – saved 32 of the 33 crewmen who were on the stern section of SS Pendleton when the ship broke in two. There were no survivors among the ship's crew in the bow section, which was found the next day by another rescue vessel. All four Coast Guardsmen were awarded the Gold Lifesaving Medal for their heroic actions.  The rescue operation has been noted as one of the most successful in the history of the U.S. Coast Guard.

Webber served in the Merchant Marine during World War II, then joined the Coast Guard in 1946. At the time of the Pendleton rescue Webber was serving as a boatswain's mate  first class at Coast Guard Station Chatham. He rose to the rank of Chief Warrant Officer (Boatswain specialty) during a 20-year military career that included a tour during the Vietnam War as a part of Operation Market Time.

Personal life
Webber was born in Milton, Massachusetts, the son of Anne (Knight) and Reverend A. Bernard Webber. He was married to Miriam Penttinen. Webber died on January 24, 2009.

Legacy
The first-in-class ,  was named in his honor. She was commissioned on 14 April 2012 at her home port of Miami, Florida.

A history of the rescue of the men of Pendleton and Mercer, including Bernard Webber's heroic role in the rescue of the men from the stern of Pendleton, was presented in the 2009 book The Finest Hours: The True Story of the U.S. Coast Guard's Most Daring Sea Rescue, by Michael J. Tougias and Casey Sherman.  This book was later reissued in a "young adult" edition and adapted into a 2016 feature film, The Finest Hours by Walt Disney Studios Motion Pictures, depicting the Pendleton rescue with Chris Pine portraying Webber.

Webber's memoir was published in 2015, titled Lightships, Lighthouses, and Lifeboat Stations: A Memoir and History.

References

Additional reading

External links
 

1928 births
2009 deaths
United States Coast Guard officers
United States Coast Guard personnel of the Vietnam War
People from Milton, Massachusetts
Recipients of the Gold Lifesaving Medal
United States Merchant Mariners of World War II
Military personnel from Massachusetts